Samambaia Sul is a Federal District Metro brazilian station on Orange line. It opened on 6 February 2002 on the already operating section of the line from Central to Terminal Samambaia. It is located between Furnas and Terminal Samambaia.

References

Brasília Metro stations
2002 establishments in Brazil
Railway stations opened in 2002